The Common Movement for Development (MCD) was a political party in Gabon, led by Paul Biyoghé Mba.

History
The party was established by Biyoghé Mba in 1994 after he left the ruling Gabonese Democratic Party (PDG).

In 1997 the party won a seat in the Senate, taken by Biyoghé Mba; and in 1999 he was appointed to the cabinet. In November 2002 the party merged into the PDG.

References

Defunct political parties in Gabon
1994 establishments in Gabon
Political parties established in 1994
2002 disestablishments in Gabon
Political parties established in 2002